Blomford is an unincorporated community in Isanti County, Minnesota, United States.

The community is located between Isanti and North Branch at the junction of Isanti County Roads 5 and 12.

Blomford is located within Isanti Township and North Branch Township.  Nearby places also include Cambridge and Weber.

Transportation 
  Isanti County Road 5
  Isanti County Road 12

References

 Official State of Minnesota Highway Map – 2013/2014 edition

Unincorporated communities in Minnesota
Unincorporated communities in Isanti County, Minnesota